The Eagle Cap Excursion Train is a heritage railroad service located in Wallowa, Oregon, United States, operated on a  line from Elgin to Joseph.  The line is owned by the Wallowa Union Railroad (WURR), a public entity, which acquired it from private owners in 2002.  The first excursion train was operated in 2003.

History
The Union Pacific Railroad (UP) came to Union County in July 1884 when the main line between Salt Lake City, Utah and Portland, Oregon passed through La Grande.

The Oregon Railway and Navigation Company (OR&N) began construction on a branch line north to Elgin that was opened in December 1890.  The OR&N itself was dissolved and its assets taken over by both the UP and the Northern Pacific Railway (NP) with the line from La Grande to Elgin transferring to the UP.  UP extended the line over the next two decades north and east to Wallowa by 1908 and eventually to Enterprise and Joseph.  Under UP operation, the line was commonly referred to as the "Joseph Branch".

UP identified the Joseph Branch for divestiture or abandonment in the late 1980s or early 1990s.  In 1993, the line was sold to the railroad holding company Rio Grande Pacific Corporation (RGPC) of Fort Worth, Texas.  RGPC created the Idaho Northern and Pacific Railroad to operate over the Joseph Branch & the Payette to Cascade line in Idaho

In 1997 the Joseph Branch was identified for abandonment later that year from Elgin to Joseph following the closure of the mill in Joseph.

After acquiring the line in 2002, the counties and their respective economic development agencies and chambers of commerce sought potential operators of either a short line (class III) railroad or a heritage railroad, which would offer tourist excursions.

The latter option was successful and the Eagle Cap Excursion Train began on August 3, 2002, six years after abandonment.  The 2003 season began on May 17, 2003 under initial operation by Idaho Northern and Pacific railroad until the county could buy and equip locomotives and it continued in the fall of that year.  The first full season of operation began in May 2004.  The excursion trains are powered by diesel gp7 locomotives, which are stored in Elgin when not in use.  Through the 2008 season, three of the passenger cars used in each train were Budd Rail Diesel Cars (RDCs), a self-propelled type of rail car.  These three cars were not used in 2009 and 2010, and were sold in 2013 to the Idaho Northern and Pacific Railroad for use on its Payette River Flyer.

As of 2010, the service was scheduled to operate on 11 days per summer season.  The service was operating between Elgin and a location known as Kimmel, and a round trip excursion took about 3 1/2 hours. A "Santa Train" is operated in December (as of 2011), although it has been suspended in some years due to lack of sponsorship.  As of May, the 2012 season of regular excursions was scheduled to begin on June 23.

See also

List of heritage railroads in the United States

References

External links
Eagle Cap Excursion Train

Heritage railroads in Oregon
Transportation in Wallowa County, Oregon
Tourist attractions in Wallowa County, Oregon
Tourist attractions in Union County, Oregon
Transportation in Union County, Oregon
2003 establishments in Oregon